Ureshino, Saga
 Ureshino, Mie
 Ureshino opening
 Ureshino-Onsen Station